Discrete Applied Mathematics is a peer-reviewed scientific journal covering algorithmic and applied areas of discrete mathematics. It is published by Elsevier and the editor-in-chief is Endre Boros (Rutgers University). The journal was split off from another Elsevier journal, Discrete Mathematics, in 1979, with that journal's founder Peter Ladislaw Hammer as its founding editor-in-chief.

Abstracting and indexing
The journal is abstracted and indexing in:

According to the Journal Citation Reports, the journal has a 2020 impact factor of 1.139.

References

External links

Combinatorics journals
Publications established in 1979
English-language journals
Elsevier academic journals